Citharidium ansorgii is a species of lutefish found in the Niger River basin in Nigeria and also reported from Cameroon.  It is the only member of its genus. Its conservation status is least concern. The only known threats which could negatively affect the population of this species are oil studies in the Lower Delta and potential impact of the invasive water hyacinth in the inland delta.

The average length of unsexed males is about 58.6 cm (23 in). The heaviest recorded specimen of this species weighed 20 pounds.
 
Citharidium ansorgii can be found in fresh water at demersal water depths, in tropical climates. This species is known for migrating upstream for spawning.

The fish named in honor of explorer William John Ansorge (1850-1913), who collected the type specimen.

References

Characiformes
Monotypic fish genera
Fish of Africa
Taxa named by George Albert Boulenger
Fish described in 1902